Zumbach is a surname. Notable people with the surname include:

Andi Zumbach (born 1969), Swiss sports shooter
Dan Zumbach (born 1960), American politician and farmer
Jake Zumbach (born 1950), Canadian football player
Jan Zumbach (1915–1986), Polish World War II flying ace
Louie Zumbach (born 1965), American politician